Montana Desperado is a 1951 American Western film directed by Wallace Fox and starring Johnny Mack Brown, Myron Healey and Virginia Herrick.

Plot

Cast
 Johnny Mack Brown as Johnny Mack Brown 
 Myron Healey as Ron Logan 
 Virginia Herrick as Sally Wilson 
 Lee Roberts as Hal Jackson 
 Steve Clark as Sheriff Ben 
 Edmund Cobb as Jim Berry

References

Bibliography
 Martin, Len D. The Allied Artists Checklist: The Feature Films and Short Subjects of Allied Artists Pictures Corporation, 1947-1978. McFarland & Company, 1993.

External links
 

1951 films
1951 Western (genre) films
American Western (genre) films
Films directed by Wallace Fox
Monogram Pictures films
American black-and-white films
1950s English-language films
1950s American films